Xavier Tomas (born 4 January 1986) is a French professional footballer who plays as a centre back for Jeunesse Esch in Luxembourg National Division.

Career
Tomas was born in Nantua, Ain. He signed for Lausanne-Sport in January 2017, then moved to Scottish club Hamilton Academical six months later. Tomas was sent off in his league debut for Hamilton, a 2–0 defeat at Aberdeen on 6 August 2017.

He was one of seven first-team players released by Hamilton at the end of the 2017–18 season, and signed for Red Star F.C. as a free agent in September 2018.

On 7 June 2019, Tomas joined Stade Lavallois on a one-year contract with an option for a further year.

Personal life
Born in France, Tomas is of Portuguese descent.

References

External links
 
 

1986 births
Living people
People from Nantua
Sportspeople from Ain
Association football defenders
French footballers
French people of Portuguese descent
French expatriate footballers
Ligue 2 players
Championnat National players
Super League Greece players
Israeli Premier League players
Scottish Professional Football League players
FC Gueugnon players
Tours FC players
Olympiacos Volos F.C. players
Levadiakos F.C. players
Maccabi Petah Tikva F.C. players
Bnei Yehuda Tel Aviv F.C. players
FC Lausanne-Sport players
Hamilton Academical F.C. players
Red Star F.C. players
Stade Lavallois players
Jeunesse Esch players
Expatriate footballers in Greece
Expatriate footballers in Israel
Expatriate footballers in Switzerland
Expatriate footballers in Scotland
Expatriate footballers in Luxembourg
French expatriate sportspeople in Greece
French expatriate sportspeople in Israel
French expatriate sportspeople in Switzerland
French expatriate sportspeople in Scotland
French expatriate sportspeople in Luxembourg
Footballers from Auvergne-Rhône-Alpes